Major Thomas Beckford (1618 - 1685) was a London clothworker and slopseller who became Sheriff of London.

He was the son of Peter Beckford of Maidenhead and was baptised in St Katherine Coleman. He married the sister of Sir William Thomas and the widow of John Eversfield. He was uncle to Peter Beckford.

Following the restoration he became a prominent Tory politician in the City of London.

In 1672 he was granted £5,000 by the Royal Navy in payment for cloth supplied to them.

He was knighted in October 1677 at the Guildhall, London.

He was accused of malpractice by Sir Francis North.

References

Sheriffs of the City of London
1685 deaths
Year of birth unknown
1618 births